Conyza schlechtendalii is a species of flowering plant in the family Asteraceae. The species is endemic to Cape Verde. It is listed as critically endangered by the IUCN.

Distribution and ecology
Conyza schlechtendalii only occurs in a small area on the island of São Nicolau. It grows between 500 and 600 metres elevations and in humid areas. The estimated number of individuals is less than 50.

References

Astereae
Endemic flora of Cape Verde
Flora of São Nicolau, Cape Verde